Lulsgate Plateau is the name given to the Carboniferous Limestone hills which form a northern outlier of the Mendip Hills, southwest of Bristol, England, approximately  above sea level, which has been occupied since prehistoric times.

The major feature on the plateau is Bristol International Airport. Cutting into the western edge of the plateau are two combes, Brockley Combe and Goblin Combe a  biological Site of Special Scientific Interest (SSSI). There are two major roads in the area — the A38 cuts across the top of the plateau, while the A370 runs along its western edge. Both run in a southwesterly direction, and join Bristol to towns and villages in Somerset. To the west of the plateau are the North Somerset Levels, and to the south is the Yeo valley.

References

Landforms of Somerset
Mendip Hills
Plateaus of England
Wrington